Varga K. Kalantarov (born 1950) is an  Azerbaijani mathematician, scientist and professor of mathematics. He is a  member of the Koç University Mathematics Department in İstanbul, Turkey.

Education
Varga Kalantarov was born in 1950. He graduated from Baku State University in 1971.
He received his PhD in Differential Equations and Mathematical Physics at the Baku Institute of Mathematics and Mechanics, Azerbaijan National Academy of Sciences in 1974. 
He received his Doctor of Sciences degree in 1988 under the supervision of Olga Ladyzhenskaya at the Steklov Institute of Mathematics, Saint Petersburg, Russia.

Academic career
After he received his PhD he started to hold a scientific researcher position in Baku Institute of Mathematics and Mechanics.
Meanwhile, between 1975 and 1981 he was a visiting researcher in the Steklov Institute of Mathematics.
From 1989 to 1993 he was the head of the Department of Partial Differential Equations at the Baku Institute of Mathematics and Mechanics.
After the perestroika era he moved to Turkey with his family in 1993. Between 1993 and 2001 he was a full time professor in Hacettepe University, Mathematics Department, Ankara. Starting from 2001 he became a full time professor in Koç University.

He has been an active researcher, having published more than 60 scientific manuscripts with more than 700 citations. He has had 16 PhD students.

Research areas
His research interests include PDEs and dynamical systems.

Representative scientific publications 
 Kalantarov, V. K.; Ladyženskaja, O. A. Formation of collapses in quasilinear equations of parabolic and hyperbolic types. (Russian) Boundary value problems of mathematical physics and related questions in the theory of functions, 10. Zap. Naučn. Sem. LOMI 69 (1977), 77-102, 274.
  Kalantarov, Varga K.; Titi, Edriss S. Global attractors and determining modes for the 3D Navier-Stokes-Voight equations. Chin. Ann. Math. Ser. B 30 (2009), no. 6, 697–714.
  Kalantarov, Varga; Zelik, Sergey Finite-dimensional attractors for the quasi-linear strongly-damped wave equation. J. Differential Equations 247 (2009), no. 4, 1120–1155.

Memberships
Varga Kalantarov is a member of the Azerbaijan Mathematical Society, Turkish Mathematical Society and the American Mathematical Society.

References

External links
 Varga Kalantarov's professional home page
 

Turkish mathematicians
20th-century Azerbaijani mathematicians
1950 births
Living people
Scientists from Istanbul
Academic staff of Koç University